Pyshkinsky is a rural locality (a khutor) in Polevoye Rural Settlement, Novoanninsky District, Volgograd Oblast, Russia. The population was 18 as of 2010.

Geography 
Pyshkinsky is located in forest steppe on the Khopyorsko-Buzulukskaya Plain, 18 km north of Novoanninsky (the district's administrative centre) by road. Cherkesovsky is the nearest rural locality.

References 

Rural localities in Novoanninsky District